Rosana may refer to:

Rosana (given name), a given name
Rosana, São Paulo, a municipality in the state of São Paulo, Brazil
 Campus Experimental de Rosana, the São Paulo State University campus in Rosana
 "Rosana" (song), a 2012 song by American rapper Wax

See also
 Rosanna (disambiguation)
 Roseanne (name)
 Rosas (surname), of which Rosana is a spelling variation